Coracomyia is a genus of bristle flies in the family Tachinidae.

Species
Coracomyia crassicornis Aldrich, 1934
Coracomyia woodi Cortés, 1976

References

Diptera of South America
Dexiinae
Tachinidae genera
Taxa named by John Merton Aldrich